The Turkish Super League Professional Football Clubs Foundation, commonly known as Union of Clubs, is a body representing the interests of professional association football clubs in Süper Lig. The organisation was founded in 2000. The organization became a member of the European Leagues in 2010 and the World Leagues Forum in 2019. The current president is Ali Koç, who was elected to the post on 21 June 2022.

Sponsorships 
 Avis
 Petrol Ofisi
 InStat
 Socios.com 
 Scouthub

Presidential history

References

External links
 Official Website

2000 establishments in Turkey
Süper Lig
Professional sports leagues in Turkey